Llanellen is a village in Monmouthshire, south-east Wales, United Kingdom.
The population was 506 in 2011.

Geography

The Blorenge mountain towers above the village. The River Usk passes close by, crossed by a bridge built in 1821 by John Upton, who also built the nearby Pant-y-Goitre Bridge. The Monmouthshire and Brecon Canal passes through Llanellen.

History and amenities 

The church of St Helen possibly dates back to the 13th century, though the church was largely re-built in Perpendicular style in the mid-19th century by architect John Prichard. In the churchyard is the grave of Sir Thomas Phillips, Mayor of Newport at the time of the Newport Rising in 1839, and a prominent defender of Welsh language and education, who lived in nearby Llanellen House.

References

External links

 Genuki basic historical info on Llanellen
 Photo of part of the village
 Photo of the church

Villages in Monmouthshire